Golin Allah Morad (also Romanized as Golīn Allāh Morād; also known as Allāh Morād and Allāh Morād-e Golīn) is a village in Direh Rural District, in the Central District of Gilan-e Gharb County, Kermanshah Province, Iran. At the 2006 census, its population was 121, in 28 families.

References 

Populated places in Gilan-e Gharb County